"King Of Siam" is the debut single by East of Eden, released on 25 July 1968 on the 7" 45 rpm vinyl record format. It was written by Dave Arbus. The band's then vocalist guitarist Al Read believes they were the first British band to be signed to the Atlantic label.

The song isn't featured on any official compilations but appears on the unofficial Kings Of Siam - Rare Tracks (1968-1970) album released in 2013 on the French label Verne Records.

Track listing 
 1968 7" UK single

Personnel 

 Dave Arbus - violin
 Ron Caines - alto saxophone
 Geoff Nicholson - guitar, vocals
 Terry Brace - bass
 Al Read - guitar, vocals

References

1968 songs
Atlantic Records singles